The 1986–87 Cypriot Third Division was the 16th season of the Cypriot third-level football league. Elpida Xylofagou won their 1st title.

Format
Fourteen teams participated in the 1986–87 Cypriot Third Division. All teams played against each other twice, once at their home and once away. The team with the most points at the end of the season crowned champions. The first two teams were promoted to 1987–88 Cypriot Second Division. The last three teams were relegated to the 1987–88 Cypriot Fourth Division.

Point system
Teams received two points for a win, one point for a draw and zero points for a loss.

League standings

Sources

See also
 Cypriot Third Division
 1986–87 Cypriot First Division
 1986–87 Cypriot Cup

Cypriot Third Division seasons
Cyprus
1986–87 in Cypriot football